Tedim or Tiddim Township is a township in Tedim District of the Chin State of Myanmar (Burma). The administrative centre for the township is the town of Tedim. Tedim is the most populous township in Chin State.

Villages
There are 55 village-tracts and 132 villages as of 2011. Major villages include (with village census id number):
Akluai (217947) in Laibung Village Tract
Buanman (164716) in Buanman Village Tract
Dakdungh (164733) in Buan Village Tract
Laibung (164736) in Laibung Village Tract
Laaitui (164670) in Laaitui Village Tract
Mualbeem (164730) in Mualbeem Village Tract
Tuisau (164737) in Laibung Village Tract
Tuithang (164680) in Tuithang Village Tract
Tuizang (164735) in Vingpi Village Tract
Tungzang Village (164681) in Tungzang Village Tract
Vangteh (164726) in Vangteh Village Tract
Vingpi (164734) in Vingpi Village Tract

Economy

Mining
Mwetaung mine

References

Townships of Chin State